The postrhinal cortex is an area of the brain which borders above the entorhinal cortex. It is the cortical region dorsally adjacent and caudal to the posterior rhinal sulcus. It is implicated in the role of memory and spatial navigation.

See also
 Grid cells
 Place cells

References

Cerebral cortex